The Tempering is a young adult novel by the American writer Gloria Skurzynski set in 1911 in the fictional mill town of Canaan (a parallel to the author's hometown of Duquesne, Pennsylvania, just south of Pittsburgh on the Monongahela River).

It tells the story of Karl Kerner and his friends Jame and Andy as they come of age among the sounds and the smoke of a booming steel town peopled by a wide variety of immigrants.

In 1983 the novel won Golden Kite Award of the Society of Children's Book Writers and Illustrators and was chosen one of the Best Books for Young Adults by the American Library Association.

References

1983 American novels
Golden Kite Award-winning works
Fiction set in 1911
Novels set in Pennsylvania